Rebound can refer to:

Film and television
 Rebound (1931 film), a 1931 movie starring Ina Claire and Robert Ames
 Rebound (American TV series), a TV series produced by Bing Crosby
 Rebound (1959 film), a 1959 movie starring Lyndon Brook and Jane Hylton
 Rebound (2005 film), a 2005 movie starring Martin Lawrence and Megan Mullally
 Rebound (2009 film), a 2009 movie directed by Afdhere Jama
 The Rebound, a 2009 movie starring Catherine Zeta-Jones
 The Rebound (2016 film), a 2016 documentary about the Miami Heat Wheels wheelchair basketball team
 Rebound (2023 film), a South Korean sports drama film 
 Rebound (2011 TV series), a 2011 Japanese TV series
 Rebound (game show), a 2015 British game show
 Rebound: The Legend of Earl "The Goat" Manigault, a 1996 HBO television movie starring Don Cheadle

Music
 Rebound!, stylized as REbound!, a Swedish pop boy band duo
 Rebound (Jessica Sierra album), a 2010 album by Jessica Sierra
 Rebound (Eleanor Friedberger album), a 2018 album by Eleanor Friedberger
 Rebound, an album by Wayman Tisdale
 "Rebound" (Arty and Mat Zo song), 2011
 "Rebound" (Sebadoh song), 1994
 "Rebound", a 2007 song by Monrose from Strictly Physical
 "The Rebound", a song by Tristan Prettyman from the album Cedar + Gold

Sports
 Rebound (sports), the ball becoming freely available after a failed attempt to put it into the goal
 Rebound (basketball), the act of successfully gaining possession of the ball after a missed goal
 Rebound sports, trampolining and similar gymnastic sports that use springed apparatus to propel the gymnast into the air
 Wallyball or "rebound volleyball" 
 Rebound exercise or "rebounding"

Other uses
 Rebound, a short period of time following a particularly painful break-up
 Rebound, a fictional comic book character created by Scott Wherle and Ted Wing III
 Rebound, a sequel to Harlem Beat
 Rebound, a 1974 arcade game released by Atari, Inc.
 Rebound tenderness, a medical sign that indicates peritonitis
 Rebound effect, the tendency of a symptom to return when a medication is discontinued or is no longer effective
 Rebound effect, a reduction in expected gains from new technologies that increase the efficiency of resource use
 Rebound headache, usually occurring when analgesics are taken too frequently for headache relief
 Post-glacial rebound, the rise of land masses that were depressed by the huge weight of ice sheets during the last ice age

See also
On the Rebound (disambiguation)

no:Retur